
The following is a list of mayors of the city of Chimichagua, Colombia.

See also

List of Governors of the Cesar Department

Notes

External links
 Chimichagua official website

Politics of Chimichagua
Politics of Colombian municipalities